Chuu (also known as Yves & Chuu) is the tenth single album from South Korean girl group Loona's pre-debut project. It was released on December 28, 2017, by Blockberry Creative. It officially introduces member Chuu and contains two tracks, Chuu's solo "Heart Attack" and "Girl's Talk", a duet with previous member Yves.

Media reception 
Chuu's music video for her song "Heart Attack" released in 2017 gained praise by fans of K-pop for its depiction of a seemingly lesbian relationship between Chuu herself and fellow Loona member Yves which is a rare case in the K-pop industry, although there has been no affirmation of their sexuality or allyship by the company or the members themselves. However, other people have stated that Heart Attack rather than being a positive representation of LGBT love, used the depiction of homoerotic love as a way to garner more fan interest.

Track listing

Charts

References

External links
 
 Chuu at Melon 

2017 singles
Loona (group) albums
Single albums
Blockberry Creative singles